First introduced in 1592, tobacco continues to dominate the social, political, and economic life in the Philippine regions where it is grown. The tobacco industry is a major force in the development of these areas, especially in Ilocos, in which it is still one of the region's leading sources of income.

History 
Tobacco came to the Philippines in 1592, when the Spanish Galleon San Clemente arrived in Manila carrying 50 kilos of Cuban tobacco seeds that were part of the Manila-Acapulco trade route. It is said that the first seeds were planted by Catholic Friars in Cagayan Valley. With a climate similar to the Vuelta Abajo region in Pinar del Rio, Cuba, the crop began to flourish and a new source of income was introduced to Spain.

In 1872, the tobacco monopoly was established, and the Filipinos, especially in the Ilocos and Cagayan Valley were forced to plant tobaccos and were given a specific quote to produce. Initially, tobacco farmers were treated fairly, but in the end, they abhorred tobacco because of the abuses committed by the Spaniards as they were forced to grow this crop. The monopoly did not only force the people, especially those from the north and Cagayan to grow tobacco but compelled them to produce more than what their piece of land could yield.

In 1882, the tobacco monopoly was abolished, but the knowledge in growing the crop remained. Until its reintroduction in the early 1900s, tobacco is grown for home consumption and by those who learned to smoke. Later on, the tobacco industry again flourished and new types were introduced.

Types 

There are 3 types of tobacco that are locally grown in the Philippines:

Virginia tobacco is mostly grown in Region 1 (Ilocos Norte, Ilocos Sur, La Union) and CAR (Abra); 

Burley tobacco is grown in Region 1 (La Union and Pangasinan), and CAR (Abra), Region 2 (Isabela and Cagayan), Region 3 (Tarlac), and Mimaropa (Occidental Mindoro); and

Native tobacco is grown in Region 1, Region 2 (Cagayan, Isabela, Quirino, and Nueva Vizcaya), the Visayan provinces of Cebu, Iloilo, Capiz, Leyte, and Negros Oriental, and the Mindanao provinces of Maguindanao, Zamboanga del Sur, Bukidnon, Misamis Ortiental, and North Cotabato.

Tobacco season varies depending on the type and region. In Luzon where Virginia is grown, the season starts around October until May. Burley and Native season starts around mid-November and until June (Burley) and July (Native). In the Visayas where Native is grown, the season starts from March to August/September. In Mindanao, Native tobacco season is from April/May until October/November. To cure the leaves, traditional tobacco farmers use either air-curing or fire-curing methods, while others use the flue-curing method.

Volume of production and Pricing 
According to the National Tobacco Administration's 2019 report, the tobacco production for each type is as follows: Virginia with 21,322,878.67 Kg or 45.79% of the total volume, Native with 11,632,507.16 Kg or 24.98% of the total, and Burley with 13,616,289.23 Kg or 29.24% of the total volume.

Tobacco pricing varies per leaf. The NTA  mandates the floor prices according to leaf grades: 

 Virginia-  AA (high), A, B, C, D, E, F1, F2, or R (reject)
 Burley- A, B, C, E, FF, and R

 Native- High Grade, Medium 1, Medium 2, Low 1, and Low 2.

See also 
 Types of tobacco
 Curing of tobacco
 History of tobacco
 Smoking in the Philippines
 Economy of the Philippines

References

External links 

 National Tobacco Administration Website
 NTA Tobacco Production Manual

Tobacco in the Philippines
Tobacco industry in the Philippines
Agriculture in the Philippines